William Pallister Richardson (25 February 1873 – 8 August 1930), known as W. P. Richardson, was a British trade unionist.

Richardson was born in Usworth, County Durham.  His father was killed in 1885, while working in the Usworth Colliery.  A few months later, William began work in the same pit.  He joined the Durham Miners' Association, and became branch secretary in 1898, and was elected to the county executive in 1912.  He served as General Secretary of the union from 1924 until his death in 1930 aged 57, and as treasurer of the Miners' Federation of Great Britain from 1921.

Richardson was also an active member of the Independent Labour Party, and its leading member in Usworth.  His brother Tom was also active in the party, and was the Member of Parliament for Whitehaven from 1910 to 1918.

References

1873 births
1930 deaths
British trade union leaders
People from Washington, Tyne and Wear
Trade unionists from Tyne and Wear